The Ghizer District is one of the 14 districts of Pakistan-administered territory of Gilgit-Baltistan. The former Ghizer District that existed from 1974 to 2019 spanned the entire upper Gilgit River Valley (also known as the Ghizer River Valley). In 2019, the former district was divided into the Gupis-Yasin District in the west and the present, smaller Ghizer District in the east.

The word Ghizer came from the name "Gherz" which means "refugees" in Khowar. "Gherz" is a village in Golaghmuli Valley. The Chitral State under the suzerainty of the British Raj forced some people to migrate towards Gupis, Yasin, Phander, Ishkomen and also to Punial. They were settled in the area between Chitral and Gupis. The area came to be called "Gherz" and the people "Gherzic".

Ghizer District comprised Punial, Gupis, Yasen, Phander and Ishkoman Valleys. The major portion of its area was ruled over by Brooshay Rajas. Currently, the living Raja families in the District have no administrative function but engage in social development activities.

History 
Historically, the region has been ruled by ethnic Kho Rajas (Katoor, Brushay, Shins) indigenous to the region. They all lead tribes which were considered brothers, however, some Balti Mehtars had also governed for some period in Mehraja's period. The longest period of rule was by Katur Dynasty and later it was divided between the Mehtar of Chitral and the Maharaja of Kashmir. After 1895 all of Ghizer was annexed to Gilgit Agency, which was directly ruled by the British Government and not by the Kashmiri people. The whole region was under FCR since 1947 to 1972.

When Zulfiqar Ali Bhutto the President of Pakistan abolished the FCR system and gave another administrative district comprising the Tehsils (Political districts) the name Ghizer was given and agreed on unanimously. The then Resident and Commissioner for Gilgit and Baltistan, Ijlal Husain [ An Officer of the now defunct Civil Service of Pakistan – CSP]  played an important role in creating this administrative division in 1974–75.

Geography

The Ghizer District is bounded on the north by the Upper Chitral District of Pakistan's Khyber Pakhtunkhwa Province and the Wakhan District of Afghanistan's Badakhshan Province, on the east by the Hunza District, the Nagar District, and the Gilgit District, on the south by the Tangir District, on the south-west by the Darel District, and on the west by the Gupis-Yasin District.

The highest peak Ghizer District is Koyo Zom (6,871 m) (Hindu Kush Range), which lies on the boundary between Ghizer District and Chitral.

Some of the main places in the district are Koh-i-Ghizer, Ishkoman and Yasin valleys. Other places include Gupis, Chatorkhand, Imit, Pingal, Shahmaran and Utz.

Some of the passes in the district are:

 Bichhar Pass (on the boundary of Ghizer and Gilgit Districts)
 Chillingi Pass
 Hayal Pass and Naltar Pass (on the boundary of Ghizer and Gilgit Districts)
 Kalandar Pass

The main river in the district is the Gilgit River. The other tributaries include the Qurumbar River, Phakora River, Hayal River, Singul River and Yasin River, Phander river tributary which also joins the main stream at different points.

Administration

The present Ghizer District consists of two tehsils:

 Ishkoman Tehsil
 Punial Tehsil

The district headquarters is the town of Gahkuch.

Education 
According to the Alif Ailaan Pakistan District Education Rankings 2015, Ghizer was ranked 10 out of 148 districts in terms of education. For facilities and infrastructure, the district was ranked 17 out of 148.The biggest contribution in the region in education is "Aga Khan Education Service Pakistan"(AKESP).

Notes

References

 
Districts of Gilgit-Baltistan
2019 establishments in Pakistan
States and territories established in 2019